Adelante ('Forward') was a socialist newspaper in Argentina, founded in April 1916 by young left wing dissidents of the Socialist Party.

The group behind Adelante upheld Marxist and internationalist principles, and opposed the reformist leadership of the party. Prominent members of the group were Augusto Kühn, Rodolfo Ghioldi, Victorio Codovilla, and the Chilean labour leader Luis Emilio Recabarren.

References

1916 establishments in Argentina
Defunct newspapers published in Argentina
Publications established in 1916
Spanish-language newspapers
Socialist newspapers